Exorcismus is a 2010 Spanish-British horror film directed by Manuel Carballo and written by David Muñoz, it stars Sophie Vavasseur and Stephen Billington.

Plot
Secluded, home-schooled teenager Emma's uncontrolled behaviour causes her to believe she is possessed by the Devil. When terrible things start to happen to her friends and family, her parents grudgingly call in the help of her uncle, who is a priest, to drive out the evil spirits.

Cast
 Sophie Vavasseur as Emma Evans
 Tommy Bastow as Alex Evans
 Richard Felix as John
 Stephen Billington as Christopher
 Doug Bradley as Priest
 Isamaya ffrench as Rose Evans
 Lazzaro Oertli as Mark Evans (Emma's brother)
 Cristina Cervià as Sofia Salgado

Production
In November 2008 Luis de la Madrid was set to direct the exorcism film, but on 22 September 2009 he was replaced by Manuel Carballo. The Spanish director David Muñoz wrote the script, and shooting began on 5 October 2009 in the Studios of Filmax.

Release
Screening rights were secured in the UK by E1 Entertainment, in Australia by Vendetta, in Brazil by Playarte, in Italy by Mediafilm, by Gulf Film for the Middle East, Lusomundo for Portugal and CDi acquired the screening rights for Argentina, Paraguay, Uruguay and Chile. The film was released in the United States as The Possession of Emma Evans, in 2011.

References

External links

2010 films
2010 horror films
2010 psychological thriller films
Films about exorcism
Religious horror films
Spanish supernatural horror films
Films scored by Zacarías M. de la Riva
2010s English-language films
2010s Spanish films
2010s British films
British supernatural horror films